The Mong Kok acid attacks (旺角高空投擲腐蝕性液體傷人案) were incidents in 2008, 2009, and 2010 where plastic bottles filled with corrosive liquid (drain cleaner) were thrown onto shoppers on Sai Yeung Choi Street South, Hong Kong, a pedestrian street and popular shopping area. A reward, originally HK$100,000, for information about the perpetrator or perpetrators, was raised to HK$300,000 following the second incident, and cameras were to be installed in the area following the December incident. The third incident occurred the very day the cameras were turned on. The fifth incident happened after Hong Kong government announced its new strategies against the incident.

13 December 2008 incident
The first incident occurred on 13 December at 5:15pm near the intersection of Sai Yeung Choi Street South and Shantung Street. Two bottles of an unspecified corrosive liquid were hurled into the crowd, possibly from the 12th floor of the Yuen King Building, onto a popular pedestrianised street area below where many were doing Christmas shopping.

The bottles hit the ground and exploded, splashing 46 people with corrosive fluids that burned through clothes and skin. People took refuge in nearby shops as water was poured onto the spilled acid to dilute it. All injuries were minor and the injured were all released from the hospital by the next day. Two days after the attack, Hong Kong Chief Executive Donald Tsang personally came to examine the area.

Investigation of the attack left the intersection closed for approximately two hours on 16 December as police re-enacted the incident. Investigators threw bottles of chalk powder from several vantage points to gauge the exact point they might have been thrown from. Water was also poured on the ground to provide a better examination of splash and flow patterns. Door to door interviews were also performed. That same day, a reward of HK$100,000 (approx. US$12,800) was offered for any information about the attack, officially classified as "throwing corrosive fluid with intent to do grievous bodily harm," a formula usually shortened to "throwing corrosive fluid with intent". The maximum punishment for this crime is life imprisonment. An individual claiming to be a Triad member later claimed online to have committed the attack, but was never traced.

A month after the attack, Yau Tsim Mong District Council voted to install four CCTV cameras in various areas with the specific aim of deterring litter-hurling in general (throwing objects from buildings is a problem in several areas of Asia) and prevent similar incidents from occurring. One of the cameras is to be installed on Hollywood Plaza at Soy Street and Sai Yeung Choi Street South. The system, which is encrypted and whose images are stored for only ten days, could be extended at later dates.

16 May 2009 incident

A second incident, almost identical to the first, occurred on 16 May 2009 again in Sai Yeung Choi Street South. Two bottles were again thrown, this time near the Soy Street intersection, some 150 meters from the original attack. The attack occurred around 4:47 pm and resulted in injuries to 30 persons, all but one of whom were released from the hospital the same day. A 16-year-old female remained in the hospital for several days afterward. Donald Tsang again came to visit the area and urged the district council to accelerate the installation of cctv cameras. The next day, the original reward for information was increased to HK$300,000. There is suspicion (though police commissioner Tang King Shing later admitted there was no formal indication of a link) that both cases were committed by the same perpetrator, although the nature of the liquid thrown in both cases has not been made public as of 20 May. Early on that date, a second reconstitution was performed, with a number of bottles (several filled with acid) thrown from several buildings. The area was cordoned off and nearby shop were covered, with the Food and Environmental Hygiene Department cleaning afterward. Twenty buildings, the Pakpolee Commercial Centre and Foo Tai Building were thus identified as "possible locations".

An unrelated incident had happened approximately one week prior to the second attack. Four persons were injured on 4 May, in Tsuen Wan District when a woman attempting to clear an ant nest spilled a mix of bleach, acid and insecticide to the street below. The incident, which injured a police officer and a baby girl, was initially thought to be a possible copycat of the December attack. The woman, who had just moved to the 12th-story flat on Hueng Woo Street, was arrested.

8 June 2009 incident
A mere few hours after the announced cameras had been turned on, a third attack occurred around 8pm on 8 June at the intersection of Nelson and Sai Yeung Choi streets. Some three hundred police officers flocked to the area in an attempt to capture the culprit. The modus operandi was very similar to the first two attacks, and resulted in 24 injuries, including several tourists. Yau Tsim Mong district councillor Hau Wing-Cheong noted: "This acid throwing is obviously a challenge to the police. It is an unscrupulous crime. The formal operation of the sky eyes was not supposed to be known by outsiders and the district council had planned to announce it after a meeting on Tuesday." Several detective teams were dispatched from other units, such as the anti-triad unit and blue-beret police. In light of the poor quality of the recorded images, which may turn out to be unusable, councillor Henry Chan Man-Yu called the HK$1.7 million system "a waste of money", and another councillor criticised the government for failing to inform the councillors of the purchasing and tendering process.

The attack elicited outraged reactions from several Hong Kong politicians, who noted, like Wing-Cheong that the attack was clearly a direct insult to the police. Legislative Councilor Paul Tse Wai-Chun noted his worry about Hong Kong's reputation for safety, since several tourists had been injured: "We don't want our good name being tarnished overnight by the attacker. Police have to gear up to make an arrest to help regain the confidence of tourists." The government's total bounty for information soon reached HK$900,000, while Donald Tsang called the attacks "cold-blooded and malicious" in a televised broadcast. Meanwhile, local business owners have begun to grow concerned and many now stock water in case of a fourth incident.

6 September 2009 incident
An incident unrelated to the mass attacks of the summer occurred the evening of 6 September at Tung Choi Street. A shopkeeper couple (Ah Dee and Tam Chan) were assaulted by a man who had come to recover some HK$300,000 that they owed him for handbag supplies. In the middle of a brief altercation, the man, identified solely as "Tsz", whipped out a bottle and splashed the pair with acid, causing severe injuries to both and minor injuries to nine others. He was captured on the scene, the wife having chased him, shouting, and thus attracting the attention of nearby police officers. Ah Dee had to be transferred to Queen Mary Hospital for emergency skin graft. Others were treated at Kwong Wah Hospital and, except for his wife, discharged later that evening.

9 January 2010 incident
On 10 January 2010, Police in Hong Kong arrested a man suspected of carrying out an acid attack in Temple Street. 30 people were injured in this attack. On 11 January 2010, police ruled out the arrested man as a suspect.

References

External links
Hong Kong Police Force

2008 crimes in Hong Kong
2009 crimes in Hong Kong
2010 crimes in Hong Kong
Crime in Hong Kong
Acid attack victims
Unsolved crimes in China
Attacks in Hong Kong
Attacks in China in 2008 
Attacks in China in 2009 
Attacks in China in 2010